James Hamilton, CBE (11 March 1918 – 11 April 2005) was a British Labour Party politician.

Hamilton was a construction engineer and was on the national executive of the Constructional Engineering Union and on the Scottish Board for Industry. He served as a councillor on Lanarkshire County Council from 1956.

Hamilton was Member of Parliament for Bothwell from 1964 to 1983, and for Motherwell North from 1983 to 1987, when he retired and was replaced by the future senior minister, John Reid.

Hamilton served as a Government whip (1969–1970 and 1974), Vice-Chamberlain of the Household (1974–1978) and Comptroller of the Household (1978–1979).

References
The Times Guide to the House of Commons, Times Newspapers Ltd, 1966 & 1983

External links 
 

1918 births
2005 deaths
Scottish Labour MPs
Scottish Labour councillors
Commanders of the Order of the British Empire
UK MPs 1964–1966
UK MPs 1966–1970
UK MPs 1970–1974
UK MPs 1974
UK MPs 1974–1979
UK MPs 1979–1983
UK MPs 1983–1987
Place of birth missing
Place of death missing